Parmotrema rampoddense, commonly known as the long-whiskered ruffle lichen, is a species of foliose lichen in the family Parmeliaceae. It is widely distributed in tropical regions and grows on the bark of oak and palm trees.

Taxonomy
It was originally described by William Nylander as a species of Parmelia, from a collection made in Sri Lanka. Mason Hale transferred the taxon to the genus Parmotrema in 1974.

Description
The colour of the lichen thallus is light greenish-grey, and lacks maculae (paler spots free of photobiont). The lobes comprising the thallus surface are 1–3 cm wide and have scattered cilia on the margin, which can be relatively long – up to 5 mm. The lower surface (the prothallus) is black, rarely with white blotches, and relatively free of rhizines.

The cortex contains atranorin, while the medulla contains alectoronic acid.

See also
List of Parmotrema species

References

rampoddense
Lichen species
Fungi described in 1900
Lichens of Asia
Lichens of Australia
Lichens of North America
Lichens of South America
Taxa named by William Nylander (botanist)